The Cathedral of St. Joseph, located in Imphal, Manipur, India, is the Latin cathedral of the Roman Catholic Archdiocese of Imphal and seat of the metropolitan bishop, currently Dominic Lumon.

The cathedral church, of an Anglo-Manipuri fusion design, is located at Mantripukhri, on the outskirts of the city, and was completed in 1999.

References

Roman Catholic cathedrals in India
Buildings and structures in Imphal
Churches in Manipur
Roman Catholic churches completed in 1999
1999 establishments in Manipur
20th-century Roman Catholic church buildings in India